The fourteenth season of Mad TV, an American sketch comedy series, originally aired in the United States on the Fox Network between September 13, 2008, and May 16, 2009.

Summary
This season saw some major changes to the cast. Feature players Daheli Hall, Dan Oster, and Anjelah Johnson did not return, while longtime cast members Jordan Peele and Michael McDonald left, though McDonald stayed on this season as a contributing writer and sketch director. New feature players for this season included comedian Matt Braunger, Erica Ash (from Logo's The Big Gay Sketch Show), stage actress Lauren Pritchard, and impressionist Eric Price. The show's format stayed largely unchanged, though the show's humor was back in full force after suffering through last season's changes in format and the hiatus brought on by the WGA strike.

MADtv also saw a change in timeslot. Between January 17, 2009, and February 21, 2009, the show was moved from its 11:00pm time slot to midnight on FOX affiliates and aired 30-minute reruns of their episodes that have previously aired from September to December 2008. Meanwhile, the show that preceded MADtv (Talkshow with Spike Feresten) was moved to the 11pm time slot and expanded to an hour.

The show's format and set also saw major changes. Instead of filming sketches before a live audience, all of the sketches were now pre-recorded and shown to the audience. The set also got a complete overhaul from its standard audience bleachers and stage setup to a dinner theater-style set up with a video monitor, a format that would stay with the show when it was temporarily revived on The CW in 2016.

In November 2008, it was announced that Mad TV would be cancelled at the end of the 2008-2009 season. 

Notable guest stars for this season include: Jerry O'Connell, the Kardashian/Jenner family (including Caitlyn Jenner back when she was Bruce), Jerry Springer, Judge Joe Brown, Ne-Yo, Jeff Probst, Fred Willard, Serena Williams, Cheech Marin, Tommy Chong, and former MADtv cast members Alex Borstein, Mo Collins, Artie Lange, Will Sasso, and Debra Wilson.

Opening montage 
The visuals of the opening montage are essentially the same as season thirteen (except Bobby Lee's footage), but the theme music is back to being mostly a rap remix, using the vocals of "MAD!" and "You are now watching..."

Cast

Repertory cast members
 Crista Flanagan  (14/17 episodes) 
 Keegan-Michael Key  (16/17 episodes) 
 Bobby Lee  (16/17 episodes) 
 Arden Myrin  (15/17 episodes) 
 Nicole Parker  (12/17 episodes; last episode: March 28, 2009) 
 Johnny Sanchez  (14/17 episodes) 

Featured cast members
 Erica Ash  (11/17 episodes) 
 Matt Braunger  (11/17 episodes) 
 Eric Price  (11/17 episodes) 
 Lauren Pritchard  (10/17 episodes)

Episodes

Home Release
Season 14 is available for streaming on HBO Max and, joining seasons 11 and 13, is one of the few seasons to have every episode available.

References

External links 

 Mad TV - official website
 
 Jump The Shark - Mad TV

14
2008 American television seasons
2009 American television seasons